Jurate Stasiunaite (born May 22, 1991) is a Lithuanian model, businesswoman, interior designer and beauty pageant title holder who was crowned Miss Grand Lithuania 2018 and represented Lithuania at Miss Grand International 2018 beauty pageant held in Yangon, Myanmar. The next year, she was crowned Miss Supranational Lithuania 2019 and represented Lithuania at Miss Supranational 2019 beauty pageant held in Silesia province, Poland.

Background and education 
Stasiunaite was born an only child in Vilnius, Lithuania. She completed an Interior Design study program from Vilnius College of Design, (VCD) in Lithuania in 2015. She also studied Japanese Language and Culture at Kanagawa University in Yokohama, Japan in 2017.

Career 
Stasiunaite has been  teaching  Japanese business protocol and western business etiquette to various corporate bodies in Japan since 2017. She trains and works with politicians/business people from across the globe and also conducts seminars for business people in Tokyo and Yokohama.

In September, 2017, Stasiunaite  founded her company named Juria Style in Japan. In 2018 together with Lithuanian fashion designers, she created new clothes and textile collections for the Japanese market.

Pageantry
Stasiunaite's journey in pageantry began with Miss Supertalent of the World 2018 in Seoul, South Korea where she was crowned fourth runner up. In the same year she participated in the Miss Rainbow of the world in Tirana, Albania where she was crowned first runner up. She then auditioned for the title Miss Grand Lithuania 2018, which she eventually won.

Stasiunaite represented Lithuania in the Miss Grand International 2018 pageant in Yangon, Myanmar, where she made it to the top 20 in "Best National Costume". In 2019, she won the Miss Supranational Lithuania 2019 title and represented Lithuania at the Miss Supranational 2019 in Silesia province, Poland. She was unplaced.

See also 
 Miss Lithuania
 Miss Supertalent

References

Living people
1991 births
Lithuanian female models
Lithuanian women
Lithuanian businesspeople
Lithuanian women company founders